Galle is a crater on Mars. It is located on the eastern rim of the huge impact basin Argyre Planitia in Argyre quadrangle. It is named after the German astronomer Johann Gottfried Galle. Galle is often known as the "happy face crater" because pareidolia causes a curved mountain range in the southern part of the crater and two smaller mountain clusters further north to appear to be a smiley face. The formation was first photographed by Viking Orbiter 1.

A second "happy face crater", smaller than Galle and located at 45.1°S, 55.0°W in Nereidum Montes, was discovered by the Mars Reconnaissance Orbiter on January 28, 2008.

Appearance in Watchmen

As the smiley is a key motif in the comic book Watchmen by Alan Moore and Dave Gibbons, the crater was used as a story location after the coincidence was noted by Gibbons. According to Gibbons, the similarity "was almost too good to be true. I worried that if we put it in, people would never believe it." The crater also appears in the same scene during the film adaptation.

Gallery

See also 
 "The Face on Mars"
 Galle (lunar crater)
 List of craters on Mars

References

External links 

 The Galle Crater on NASA.gov

Impact craters on Mars
Argyre quadrangle
Watchmen